The name Bising has been used for 14 tropical cyclones in the Philippine Area of Responsibility by PAGASA in the Western Pacific.

 Tropical Depression Bising (1966) – a tropical depression that was only recognized by PAGASA.
 Tropical Depression Bising (1970) – a tropical depression that was only recognized by PAGASA.
 Typhoon Dinah (1974) (T7405, 06W, Bising) – struck the Philippines and Vietnam.
 Tropical Storm Polly (1978) (T7803, 03W, Bising) – struck southern Japan.
 Typhoon Nelson (1982) (T8202, 02W, Bising) – struck the Philippines.
 Typhoon Ken (1986) (T8602, 02W, Bising) – did not make landfall.
 Typhoon Ofelia (1990) (T9005, 06W, Bising) – struck Taiwan and China.
 Typhoon Owen (1994) (T9401, 02W, Bising) – struck the Philippines.
 Typhoon Otto (1998) (T9802, 04W, Bising) – struck Taiwan and China.
 Typhoon Sonca (2005) (T0503, 03W, Bising) – did not make landfall.
 Tropical Depression Bising (2009) – a tropical depression that was only recognized by PAGASA.
 Tropical Depression Bising (2013) – only recognized by JMA and PAGASA.
 Tropical Depression Bising (2017) – only recognized by JMA and PAGASA.
 Typhoon Surigae (2021) (T2102, 02W, Bising) — a long lived storm that approached and affected the Philippines as a Category 5 super typhoon before turning out to sea.

Pacific typhoon set index articles